Winslow William Hall (May 15, 1912 – December 27, 1995) was an American rower, born in Oakland, California, who competed in the 1932 Summer Olympics.

In 1932, he won the gold medal as member of the American boat in the eights competition.

External links
 
 
 
 

1912 births
1995 deaths
Sportspeople from Oakland, California
Rowers at the 1932 Summer Olympics
Olympic gold medalists for the United States in rowing
American male rowers
Medalists at the 1932 Summer Olympics